St Anne's Church is a Grade II* listed parish church in the Church of England in Buxton, Derbyshire.

History 
The single-storey church dates from the 17th century. It is believed to be the oldest building in Buxton. The date of 1625 is carved on the Saxon font and on the porch but it incorporated an earlier building, believed to have been a tithe barn or a farmhouse. The vestry was added at the side of the original rectangular building in 1715. The church was refurbished in 1841 and extended in 1894. The slate roof was restored in 1956.

St Anne's Church was converted to a school following the completion of the new Buxton parish church of St John the Baptist in 1811. It was then used as a Sunday school and as a mortuary chapel. The church was later closed before being reinstated for church services in 1885.

The Methdodist preacher John Wesley delivered a sermon in the church when he visited Buxton on 24 May 1783. The 18th-century Irish comedy actor John Kane was buried in the graveyard in 1799 (after he died mistakenly eating hemlock or wolf's bane). His gravestone is Grade II listed.

Parish status 
The church is in a joint parish with:

 Christ Church, Burbage
 Christ Church, King Sterndale
 St James' Church, Buxton
St John The Baptist Church, Buxton
 St Mary's Church, Buxton

See also
Grade II* listed buildings in High Peak
Listed buildings in Buxton

References 

Grade II* listed churches in Derbyshire
Buildings and structures in Buxton